The chronology of the ancient Near East is a framework of dates for various events, rulers and dynasties. Historical inscriptions and texts customarily record events in terms of a succession of officials or rulers: "in the year X of king Y". Comparing many records pieces together a relative chronology relating dates in cities over a wide area.

For the 3rd and 2nd millennia BC, this correlation is less certain but the following periods can be distinguished:

Early Bronze Age: Following the rise of cuneiform writing in the preceding Uruk period and Jemdet Nasr periods came a series of rulers and dynasties whose existence is based mostly on scant contemporary sources (e.g. En-me-barage-si), combined with archaeological cultures, some of which are considered problematic (e.g. Early Dynastic II). The lack of dendrochronology, astronomical correlations, and sparsity of modern, well-stratified sequences of radiocarbon dates from Southern Mesopotamia makes it difficult to assign absolute dates to this floating chronology.
Middle Bronze Age: Beginning with the Akkadian Empire around 2300 BC, the chronological evidence becomes internally more consistent. A good picture can be drawn of who succeeded whom, and synchronisms between Mesopotamia, the Levant and the more robust chronology of Ancient Egypt can be established. Unlike the previous period there are a variety of data points serving to help turn this floating chronology into a fixed one. These include astronomical events, dendrochronology, radiocarbon dating, and even a volcanic eruption. Despite this no agreement has been reached. The most commonly seen solution is to place the reign of Hammurabi from 1792 to 1750 BC, the "middle chronology", but there is far from a consensus.
Late Bronze Age: The fall of the First Babylonian Empire was followed by a period of chaos where "Late Old Babylonian royal inscriptions are few and the year names become less evocative of political events, early Kassite evidence is even scarcer, and until recently Sealand I sources were near to non-existent". Afterward came a period of stability with the Assyrian Middle Kingdom, Hittite New Kingdom, and the Third Babylon Dynasty (Kassite).
The Bronze Age collapse: A "Dark Age" begins with the fall of Babylonian Dynasty III (Kassite) around 1200 BC, the invasions of the Sea Peoples and the collapse of the Hittite Empire.
Early Iron Age: Around 900 BC, written records once again become more numerous with the rise of the Neo-Assyrian Empire, establishing relatively secure absolute dates. Classical sources such as the Canon of Ptolemy, the works of Berossus, and the Hebrew Bible provide chronological support and synchronisms. An inscription from the tenth year of Assyrian king Ashur-Dan III refers to an eclipse of the sun, and astronomical calculations among the range of plausible years date the eclipse to 15 June 763 BC. This can be corroborated by other mentions of astronomical events, and a secure absolute chronology established, tying the relative chronologies to the now-dominant Gregorian calendar.

Variant Middle Bronze Age chronologies
Due to the sparsity of sources throughout the "Dark Age", the history of the Near Eastern Middle Bronze Age down to the end of the First Babylonian Dynasty is founded on a floating or relative chronology. There have been attempts to anchor the chronology using records of eclipses and other methods such as dendrochronology and radiocarbon dating, but none of those dates is widely supported.

Currently the major schools of thought on the absolute dating of this period are separated by 56 or 64 years. This is because the key source for this analysis are the omen observations in the Venus tablet of Ammisaduqa and these are multiples of the 8-year cycle of Venus visibility from Earth. More recent work by Vahe Gurzadyan has suggested that the fundamental 8-year cycle of Venus is a better metric (updated). Some scholars discount the validity of the Venus tablet of Ammisaduqa entirely.  The alternative major chronologies are defined by the date of the 8th year of the reign of Ammisaduqa, king of Babylon.

The most common Venus Tablet solutions (fall of Babylon)

Long Chronology (Babylon falls 1651 BC)
Middle Chronology (Babylon falls 1595 BC)
Middle Low Chronology (Babylon falls 1587 BC)
Short Chronology (Babylon falls 1531 BC)
Ultra Short Chronology (Babylon falls 1499 BC)

The following table gives an overview of the different proposals, listing some key dates and their deviation relative to the middle chronology, omitting the Supershort Chronology (Babylon falls in 1466 BC)):

Sources of chronological data

Astronomical

Venus tablet of Ammisaduqa

In the series, the conjunction of the rise of Venus with the new moon provides a point of reference, or rather three points, for the conjunction is a periodic occurrence. Identifying an Ammisaduqa conjunction with one of these calculated conjunctions will therefore fix, for example, the accession of Hammurabi as either 1848, 1792, or 1736 BC, known as the "high" ("long"), "middle", and "short (or low) chronology".

A record of the movements of Venus over roughly a 16 day period during the reign of a king, believed to be Ammisaduqa of the First Babylonian Dynasty, recorded on the omen tablet Enuma Anu Enlil 63. Twenty copies and fragments have been recovered, all Neo-Assyrian and later.
 An example entry is 
"In month XI, 15th day, Venus in the west disappeared, 3 days in the sky it stayed away, and in month XI, 18th day, Venus in the east became visible: springs will open, Adad his rain, Ea his floods will bring, king to king messages of reconciliation will send."
Using it, various scholars have proposed dates for the fall of Babylon based on the 56/64-year cycle of Venus. It has been suggested that the fundamental 8-year cycle of Venus is a better metric, leading to the proposal of an "ultra-low" chronology. Other researchers have declared the data to be too noisy for any use in fixing the chronology.

Eclipses

A number of lunar and solar eclipses have been suggested for use in dating the ancient Near East. Many suffer from the vagueness of the original tablets in showing that an actual eclipse occurred. At that point, it becomes a question of using computer models to show when a given eclipse would have been visible at a site, complicated by difficulties in modeling the slowing rotation of the earth (ΔT) and uncertainty about the lengths of months.

Most calculations for dating using eclipses have assumed the Venus Tablet of Ammisaduqa to be a legitimate source. The most notable omitted eclipses are the Mari Eponym Chronicle eclipse from the time of Shamshi-Adad I and the Sargon of Akkad eclipse (from the Legends of the Kings of Akkad and a liver omen).

Some important examples:

Nineveh eclipse – found in an Assyrian limmu list q.e. "Bur-Sagale of Guzana, revolt in the city of Ashur. In the month Simanu an eclipse of the sun took place.", part of the Eponym dating system. This eclipse is considered to be solidly dated to 15 June 763 BC, approximately in the ninth year of the reign of king Ashur-dan III.
Mursili's eclipse – a text in the 10th year of the reign of Mursili II of the Hittite Empire, "[When] I marched [to the land of A]zzi, the Sungod gave a sign.", has been interpreted as an eclipse event. Proposed dates range between 1340 BC and 1308 BC.
Shulgi Eclipse – Based on a prophecy text, Enuma Anu Enlil 20 which states "If an eclipse occurs on the 14th day of Simānu ... The  king of Ur, his son will  wrong him, and the son who wronged his father, Šamaš will catch him. He will die in the mourning place of his father" from the end of the reign of Shulgi of the Ur III dynasty. A date of 25 July 2093 BC has been proposed. These prophecies were written after the fact to help predict future events. A second prophecy, EAE 21 (month 12), predicts the fall of Ur III in the reign of Ibbi-Sin stating "If an eclipse occurs on  the 14th day of Addaru ... The  prediction  is  given for the king of the world:  The  destruction  of  Ur".
Babylon Eclipse – Another section in EAE 20 (month 3) refers to the fall of Babylon ie "if an eclipse occurs on the 14th day of Shabattu (month XI), and the god, in his eclipse ... The prediction is given for Babylon: the destruction of Babylon is near ...". It refers to a solar eclipse followed by a lunar eclipse. The most likely solution, 1547 BC, does not match up with Venus Tablet solutions. Note that there are textual problems with the prophecy and it has been suggested that Akkad is actually the city in question.

Egyptian Lunar Observations
There are thirteen Egyptian New Kingdom lunar observations which are used to pin the chronology in that period by locking down the accession year of Ramsesses II to 1279 BC. There are a number of issues with this including a) the regnal lengths for Neferneferuaten, Seti I, and Horemheb are actually not known with accuracy, b) where the observations occurred (Memphis is usually assumed), c) what day the observations were taken (two are known to be the 1st lunar day), and d) the Egyptian calendar for this period is not fully known, especially how intercalary months were handled. Since the Assyrian eponym list is accurate to 1 year only back to 1132 BC, ancient Near East chronology for the preceding century or so is anchored to Ramsesses II, based on synchronisms and the Egyptian lunar observations.

Kudurru Symbols
A number of attempts have been made to date Kassite Kudurru by mapping the symbols to astrononomical elements, using Babylonian star catalogues such as MUL.APIN with so far very limited results.

Inscriptional
Thousands of cuneiform tablets have been found in an area running from Anatolia to Egypt. While many are the ancient equivalent of grocery receipts, these tablets, along with inscriptions on buildings and public monuments, provide the major source of chronological information for the ancient Middle East.

Underlying issues
State of materials

While there are some relatively pristine display-quality objects, the vast majority of recovered tablets and inscriptions are damaged. They have been broken with only portions found, intentionally defaced, and damaged by weather or soil. Many tablets were not even baked and have to be carefully handled until they can be hardened by heating.
Provenance

The site of an item's recovery is an important piece of information for archaeologists, which can be compromised by two factors. First, in ancient times old materials were often reused as building material or fill, sometimes at a great distance from the original location. Secondly, looting has disturbed archaeological sites at least back to Roman times, making the provenance of looted objects difficult or impossible to determine. Lastly, counterfeit versions of these object are a longstanding traditional, often difficult to detect.
Multiple versions

Key documents like the Sumerian King List were repeatedly copied and redacted over generations to suit current political needs. For this and other reasons, the SKL, once regarded as an important historical source, is now only used with caution, if at all, for the period under discussion here.
Translation

The translation of cuneiform documents is quite difficult, especially for damaged source material. Additionally, our knowledge of the underlying languages, like Akkadian and Sumerian, has evolved over time, so a translation done now may be quite different from one done in AD 1900: there can be honest disagreement over what a document says. Worse, the majority of archaeological finds have not yet been published, much less translated. Those held in private collections may never be.
Political slant

Many of our important source documents, such as the Assyrian King List, are the products of government and religious establishments, with a natural bias in favor of the king or god in charge. A king may even take credit for a battle or construction project of an earlier ruler. The Assyrians in particular have a literary tradition of putting the best possible face on history, a fact the interpreter must constantly keep in mind.

King lists
Historical lists of rulers were traditional in the ancient Near East.

Sumerian King List
Covers rulers of Mesopotamia from a time "before the flood" to the fall of the Isin Dynasty, depending on the version. Its use for pre-Akkadian rulers is limited to none. It continues to have value for the Akkadian period and later. The Sumerian King List omits any mention of Lagash, even though it was clearly a major power during the period covered by the list. The Royal Chronicle of Lagash appears to be an attempt to remedy that omission, listing the kings of Lagash in the form of a chronicle though some scholars believe the Lagash chronicle to be either a parody of the Sumerian King List or a complete fabrication.

Babylonian King List
This list deals only with the rulers of Babylon. It has been found in two versions, denoted A and B both written in Neo-Babylonian times. The later dynasties in the list document the Kassite and Sealand periods though a number of Kassite rulers are damaged. Ruler names largely match other records but the regnal lengths are more problematic. There is also a Babylonian King List of the Hellenistic Period in later part of the 1st millennium.

Assyrian King List
The Assyrian King List extends back to the reign of Shamshi Adad I (1809 – c. 1776 BC), an Amorite who conquered Assur while
creating a new kingdom in Upper Mesopotamia. The list extends to the reign of Shalmaneser V (727–722 BC). It is believed that the list was first constructed in the time of Ashur-uballit I (1365–1330 BC). 
The king list is considered to be roughly correct from that point on, less so for earlier entries which have numerous inconsistencies.
Its purpose is to create a narrative of continuity and legitimacy for Assyrian kingship, blending in the kings of Amorite origin.

The existing source consists of 3 mostly complete tables and 2 small fragments.

Unfortunately there are differences between the tablets involving regnal lengths, names, and in one case a king being left out entirely. Not surprising given that they are noted as being copies of earlier tablets.

Chronicles

Many chronicles have been recovered in the ancient Near East, most fragmentary, with a political slant, and sometimes contradictory; but when combined with other sources, they provide a rich source of chronological data.

Most available chronicles stem from later Babylonian and Assyrian sources. The
Dynastic Chronicle, after a Sumerian King List type beginning, involves
Babylonian kings from Simbar-Šipak to Erība-Marduk. The Chronicle of Early Kings, after an early preamble, involves kings of the First Babylonian Empire
ending with the First Sealand Dynasty. The Tummal Inscription relates
events from the early Sumerian king Ishbi-Erra of Isin. The Chronicle of the Market Prices mentions various Babylonian rulers beginning from the period 
of Hammurabi. The Eclectic Chronicle relates events of the post-Kassite Babylonian kings. Other examples are the Religious Chronicle, and
Nebuchadnezzar Chronicle, among others.

The Synchronistic Chronicle, found in the library of Assurbanipal in Nineveh records the diplomacy of the Assyrian empire with the Babylonian empire. While useful, the consensus is that this chronicle should not be considered reliable.
Chronicle P provides the same type of information as the Assyrian Synchronistic Chronicle, but from the Babylonian point of view.

Royal inscriptions

Rulers in the ancient Near East liked to take credit for public works. Temples, buildings and statues are likely to identify their royal patron. Kings also publicly recorded major deeds such as battles won, titles acquired, and gods appeased. These are very useful in tracking the reign of a ruler.

Year lists

Unlike current calendars, most ancient calendars were based on the accession of the current ruler, as in "the 5th year in the reign of Hammurabi". Each royal year was also given a title reflecting a deed of the ruler, like "the year Ur was defeated". The compilation of these years are called date lists.

Eponym (limmu) lists

In Assyria, a royal official or limmu was selected in every year of a king's reign. Many copies of these lists have been found, with certain ambiguities. There are sometimes too many or few limmū for the length of a king's reign, and sometimes the different versions of the eponym list disagree on a limmu, for example in the Mari Eponym Chronicle. The eponym list is considered accurate within 1 year back to 1133 BC. Before that uncertainty creeps in. There is now an Assyrian Revised Eponym List which attempts to resolve some of these issues.

Trade, diplomatic, and disbursement records

As often in archaeology, everyday records give the best picture of a civilization. Cuneiform tablets were constantly moving around the ancient Near East, offering alliances (sometimes including daughters for marriage), threatening war, recording shipments of mundane supplies, or settling accounts receivable. Most were tossed away after use as one today would discard unwanted receipts, but fortunately for us, clay tablets are durable enough to survive even when used as material for wall filler in new construction.

Amarna letters

A key find was a number of cuneiform tablets from Amarna in Egypt, the city of the pharaoh Akhenaten. Mostly in Akkadian, the diplomatic language of the time, a number of them name foreign rulers including kings of Assyria and Babylon
as well as Tushratta king of Mitanni and rulers of small states in the 
Levant.
The letters date from the later stages of the reign of Amenhotep III
(c. 1386–1349 BC) to the 2nd year of Tutankhamun (c. 1341–1323 BC). Assuming that the correct foreign rulers have been identified, this provides
and important point of synchronization. Identification can be difficult 
due to the propensity for states to re-use regnal names.

Classical
We have some data sources from the classical period:
Berossus

Berossus, a Babylonian astronomer and historian born during the time of 
Alexander the Great wrote a history of Babylon which is
a lost book. Portions were preserved by other classical writers
mainly Josephus via Alexander Polyhistor. The surviving material
is in chronicle form and covers the Neo-Babylonian Empire period from
Nabopolassar (627–605 BC) to Nabonidus (556–539 BC).

Canon of Ptolemy (Canon of Kings)
This book provides a list of kings starting with the Neo-Babylonian Empire and ending with the early Roman Emperors. The entries relevant to the ancient Near East run from Nabonassar (747–734 BC) to the Macedonian king Alexander IV
(323–309 BC). Though mostly accepted as accurate there are known
issues with the Canon. Some rulers are omitted, there are times for which no
ruler is listed, and the early dates have been converted from the lunar
calendar used by the Babylonians to the Egyptian solar calendar.

Hebrew Bible

Not having the stability of buried clay tablets, the records of the Hebrews have a great deal of ancient editorial work to sift through when used as a source for chronology. However, the Hebrew kingdoms lay at the crossroads of Babylon, Assyria, Egypt and the Hittites, making them spectators and often victims of actions in the area during the 1st millennium. Mostly concerned with regional events in the Levant, in 2 Kings 23 , thought to be pharaoh Necho II, is mentioned three times.
Neo-Babylonian kings are mentioned in 2 Kings 20, thought to be Marduk-apla-iddina II, in 2 Kings 24 Nebuchadnezzar II and in 2 Kings  25 , thought to be Amel-Marduk. In Isaiah 38 the neo-Assyrian kings Sennacherib and Esarhaddon are mentioned.

Dendrochronology

Dendrochronology attempts to use the variable growth pattern of trees, expressed in their rings, to build up a chronological timeline. At present there are no continuous chronologies for the Near East, and a floating chronology has been developed using trees in Anatolia for the Bronze and Iron Ages. Professor of archaeology at Cornell, Sturt Manning, has spearheaded efforts to use this floating chronology with radiocarbon wiggle-match to anchor the chronology. His research has recently been included in the Oxford History of the Ancient Near East and has been cited widely in the recent academic literature.

Radiocarbon dating

As in Egypt and the eastern Mediterranean, radiocarbon dates run one or two centuries earlier than the dates proposed by archaeologists. Recently, radiocarbon dates from the final destruction of Ebla have been shown to definitely favour the middle chronology (with the fall of Babylon and Aleppo at c. 1595 BC), and seem to discount the ultra-low chronology (same event at c. 1499 BC), although it is emphasized that this is not presented as a decisive argument.

Radiocarbon dates in literature should be discounted if they do not include the raw C14 date and the calibration method. There have also been issues with dating for charcoal samples, which may reflect much older wood the charcoal was made from. In recent years some properly calibrated radiocarbon dates have begun to appear:
In 1991 Two grain samples from the Middle Uruk layer of the Uruk Mound at Abu Salabikh were accelerator radiocarbon dated with calibrated dates of 3520 ± 130 BC. Calibration was based on that of Pearson.
In 2013 a bone awl from Kish from Phase 2 in the YWN area, the transition between Early Dynastic and Akkadian periods, was accelerator radiocarbon dated to 2471–2299 BC (3905 ± 27 C14 years BP).
In 2017 charcoal sample from the base area of the Umm Al Nar fortress tower at Tell Abraq provided a radiocarbon date of 2461–2199 BC (3840±40 C14 years BP). It was calibrated with  IntCal13. The Umm Al Nar period is co-temporal with the Akkadian through Ur III periods in Mesopotamia.

Other emerging technical dating methods include rehydroxylation dating, luminescence dating, archaeomagnetic dating and the dating of lime plaster from structures.

Synchronisms

Egypt

At least as far back as the reign of Thutmose I, Egypt took a strong interest in the ancient Near East. At times they occupied portions of the region, a favor returned later by the Assyrians. Some key synchronisms:
Battle of Kadesh, involving Ramses II of Egypt ("Year 5 III Shemu day 9") and Muwatalli II of the Hittite empire. This would be 12 May 1274 BC, in the usually accepted Egyptian chronology. Recorded by both Egyptian (Kadesh inscriptions) and Hittite records.
Peace treaty (Egyptian–Hittite peace treaty) between Ramses II of Egypt, in his 21st year of reign (roughly 1259 BC) and Hattusili III of the Hittites. Hieroglyphic copies were found at the temple of Amun at Karnak and at the Ramesseumand. Fragmentary Akkadian cuneiform fragments were found at Hattusa.
Amenhotep III (Amenophis III) marries the daughter of Shuttarna II of Mitanni. There is also a record of messages from the pharaoh to Kadashman-Enlil I of Babylon in the Amarna Letter (EA1–5). Other Amarna letters link Amenhotep III to Burnaburiash II of Babylon (EA6) and Tushratta of Mitanni (EA17–29) as well.
Akhenaten (Amenhotep IV) married the daughter of Tushratta of Mitanni (as did his father Amenhotep III), leaving a number of records. He also corresponded with Burna-Buriash II of Babylon (EA7–11, 15), and Ashuruballit I of Assyria (EA15–16)
Bay an official of the Egyptian queen Twosret, in a tablet (RS 86.2230) found at Ras Shamra, was in communication with Ammurapi, the last ruler of Ugarit. Bay was in office from approximately 1194–1190 BC. This sets an upper limit on the destruction date of Ugarit.
Pottery seals of the Egyptian pharaoh Pepi I have been found in the wreckage of the city of Ebla, destroyed by Naram-Sin of Akkad.

There are problems with using Egyptian chronology. Besides some minor issues of regnal lengths and overlaps, there are three long periods of poorly documented chaos in the history of ancient Egypt, the First, Second, and Third Intermediate Periods, whose lengths are doubtful. This means the Egyptian Chronology actually comprises three floating chronologies. The chronologies of Mesopotamia, the Levant and Anatolia depend significantly on the chronology of Ancient Egypt. To the extent that there are problems in the Egyptian chronology, these issues will be inherited in chronologies based on synchronisms with Ancient Egypt.

Indus Valley

There is much evidence that the Bronze Age civilization of the Indus Valley traded with the Near East, including clay seals found at Ur III and in the Persian Gulf. Seals and beads were also found at the site of Esnunna. In addition, if the land of Meluhha does indeed refer to the Indus Valley, then there are extensive trade records ranging from the Akkadian Empire until the Babylonian Dynasty I.

Thera and Eastern Mediterranean

Goods from Greece made their way into the ancient Near East, directly in Anatolia and via the island of Cyprus in the rest of the region and Egypt. A Hittite king, Tudhaliya IV, even captured Cyprus as part of an attempt to enforce a blockade of the Assyrians.

The eruption of the Thera volcano provides a possible time marker for the region. A large eruption, it would have sent a plume of ash directly over Anatolia and filled the sea in the area with floating pumice. This pumice appeared in Egypt, apparently via trade. Current excavations in the Levant may also add to the timeline. The exact date of the volcanic eruption has been the subject of strong debate, with dates ranging between 1628 and 1520 BC. Radiocarbon dating has placed it at between 1627 BC and 1600 BC with a 95% degree of probability. Archaeologist Kevin Walsh, accepting the radiocarbon dating, suggests a possible date of 1628 and believes this to be the most debated event in Mediterranean archaeology. For the ANE chronology a key problem is the lack of a linkage between the eruption and some point on the relative chronology.

See also

Early Dynastic Period (Mesopotamia)
Egyptian chronology
Minoan chronology
List of Mesopotamian dynasties
List of rulers of Elam
List of Neo-Hittite kings
List of kings of Ebla
List of kings of Mari
Template:Rulers of the ancient Near East

Notes

References
 Johannes van der Plicht1 and Hendrik J Bruins, "Radiocarbon Dating in Near-Eastern Contexts: Confusion and Quality Control", Radiocarbon, vol.  43, no. 3, pp. 1155–1166, January 2006
 Sturt W. Manning et al., "Radiocarbon offsets and old world chronology as relevant to Mesopotamia, Egypt, Anatolia and Thera (Santorini)", Nature Scientific Reports, vol. 10, 17 August 2020 https://doi.org/10.1038/s41598-020-69287-2
 Neocleous, A., Azzopardi, G., & Dee, M. W. (2019). Identification of possible δ14C anomalies since 14 ka BP: A computational intelligence approach. Science of the Total Environment, vol. 663, pp. 162–169. https://doi.org/10.1016/j.scitotenv.2019.01.251

Albrecht Goetze, "The Kassites and Near Eastern Chronology," Journal of Cuneiform Studies, vol. 18, no. 4, pp. 97–101, 1964

 Walther Sallaberger and Ingo Schrakam, Associated Regional Chronologies for the Ancient Near East and the Eastern Mediterranean: History and Philology (Arcane), Brepols Publishers (4 March 2015) 
Glenn Schwartz, "Problems of Chronology: Mesopotamia, Anatolia, and the Syro-Levantine Region", in Beyond Babylon: Art, Trade, and Diplomacy in the Second Millennium B.C., pp. 450–452, Metropolitan Museum of Art, 2008 
H. Weiss et al., "The Genesis and Collapse of Third Millennium North Mesopotamian Civilization", Science, vol. 261, iss. 5124, pp. 995–1004, 20 August 1993

External links
Cuneiform Digital Library Initiative
Electronic Text Corpus of Sumerian Literature
NERD (Near East Radiocarbon Dates)

Ancient Near East
Chronology
History of the Middle East
History of Western Asia
Alternative chronologies